Artem Oleksandrovych Yashkin (born 29 April 1975) is a retired Ukrainian footballer.

Career
He was born in Vologda, now in Russia. After coming to play for FC Dynamo Kyiv, he was offered to accept the Ukrainian citizenship and play for the Ukraine national football team. He has capped eight games for the Ukraine National Football team.

Playing career

* - played games and goals

External links

References

1975 births
Living people
Russian emigrants to Ukraine
People from Vologda
Ukrainian footballers
Ukraine international footballers
Ukrainian expatriate footballers
Russian Premier League players
Ukrainian Premier League players
FC Shinnik Yaroslavl players
FC Dynamo Kyiv players
FC Chornomorets Odesa players
FC Arsenal Kyiv players
Dinaburg FC players
FC Elista players
Jeju United FC players
K League 1 players
Naturalized citizens of Ukraine
Dong Thap FC players
Association football midfielders
Footballers from Vologda